James Carroll (December 2, 1791 – January 16, 1873) was a Maryland politician and director of the Baltimore & Ohio Railroad and the Chesapeake & Ohio Canal Company.

Early life
James Carroll was born in Baltimore, Maryland on December 2, 1791. He graduated from St. Mary's College in Baltimore in 1808. Carroll studied law, but did not practice. He settled on a farm on the West River, but later moved back to Baltimore. His reputation was improved when he became judge of the orphans' court and a trustee of the poor. He served as a director of the Baltimore & Ohio Railroad and the Chesapeake & Ohio Canal Company.

Career

Carroll was elected a Democrat to the Twenty-Sixth United States Congress to represent Maryland's Fourth District. He took seat in 1839, but had lost re-election and left in 1841. Carroll ran for Governor of Maryland in 1844, winning his party's nomination, but lost in the general election to Whig Thomas G. Pratt by a margin of a mere 548 votes.

Death
He retired and died on January 16, 1873. He is interred in the Carroll vault in Old Saint Paul's Cemetery in Baltimore, Maryland.

He was a member of the Carroll family.

References

External links

1791 births
1873 deaths
19th-century American railroad executives
Politicians from Baltimore
Baltimore and Ohio Railroad people
St. Mary's Seminary and University alumni
James
Democratic Party members of the United States House of Representatives from Maryland